This is a list of members of the Victorian Legislative Assembly, from the elections of 14 October 1897 to the elections of 1 November 1900. From 1889 there were 95 seats in the Assembly.

Victoria was a British self-governing colony in Australia at the time.

Note the "Term in Office" refers to that member's term(s) in the Assembly, not necessarily for that electorate.

Francis Mason was Speaker. William Beazley was Chairman of Committees.

 Anderson died 3 May 1898; replaced by John Pollock Spiers, sworn-in June 1898.
 Hancock died  22 November 1899; replaced by Samuel Mauger, sworn-in January 1900.
 McCay lost a by-election on 20 December 1899 after accepting the position of Minister for Education; replaced by Harry Lawson.
 E. Murphy died 12 April 1900; replaced by George Holden, sworn-in June 1900.
 Stapleton died 9 November 1899; replaced by David Kerr, sworn-in December 1899.
 Zox died 23 October 1899; replaced by Samuel Gillott, sworn-in November 1899.

References

Members of the Parliament of Victoria by term
19th-century Australian politicians